Saba comorensis is a species of flowering plant in the Apocynaceae family. It is commonly called bungo fruit (pl. mabungo), mbungo, or rubber vine and is widespread across most of tropical Africa as well as in Madagascar and Comoros. It grows in Tanzania and Somalia, for example on the islands of Pemba and Zanzibar in the Indian Ocean. The species belongs to the genus Saba from the family Apocynaceae. The fruit looks similar to an orange with a hard orange peel but when opened it contains a dozen or so pips, which have the same texture as a mango seed with the fibres and juices all locked in these fibres.

The fruit also makes a delicious juice drink which has been described as tasting "somewhere between a mango, an orange and a pineapple"  The aromatic juice of the bungo fruit is also popular and highly appreciated on Pemba Island and other parts of coastal Tanzania.

Not only in the Tanzanian Mahale Mountains National Park, S. comorensis is dispersed by chimpanzees.

References

External links
 Rubber vine or Mabungo
 World Agroforestry Centre
 West African Plant Database
 Georg Schweinfurth: Sammlung botanischer Zeichnungen im BGBM, Germany
 Lost crops of Africa: Volume III: Fruits (2008). Gumvines (pp. 270-279)

Rauvolfioideae
Tropical fruit
Flora of Madagascar
Flora of the Comoros
Fruits originating in Africa
Plants described in 1844
Taxa named by Marcel Pichon
Taxa named by Wenceslas Bojer
Taxa named by Alphonse Pyramus de Candolle